Huang Kuo-chung (born 1954) is a Taiwanese lawyer and retired politician who served in the Legislative Yuan from 1996 to 1999.

He represented Lien Chan and James Soong during the 2004 presidential election, which was won by Chen Shui-bian. The Lien–Soong legal team argued that electoral fraud had occurred and asked the Taiwan High Court to nullify the election's result. In 2007, Huang was named to the Executive Yuan's .

References

1954 births
Living people
20th-century Taiwanese lawyers
New Party Members of the Legislative Yuan
Kuomintang Members of the Legislative Yuan in Taiwan
Members of the 3rd Legislative Yuan
Kaohsiung Members of the Legislative Yuan
21st-century Taiwanese lawyers